Brazil Classics, Vol. 5: The Hips of Tradition is a studio album by Brazilian singer-songwriter Tom Zé. This is Tom Zé's first studio album on Luaka Bop and is the 1992 follow-up to his previous compilation released on the same label, Brazil Classics, Vol 4. "Jingle do Disco" features David Byrne on vocals.

Track listing
 "Ogodô, Ano 2000" – 3:57
 "Sem a Letra “A”" – 3:00
 "Feira de Santana" – 2:53
 "Sofro de Juventude" – 3:15
 "Cortina 1” – 1:06
 "Taí" – 1:05
 "Iracema" – 1:44
 "Fliperama” – 3:04
 "O Amor é Velho-Menina” – 3:08
 "Cortina 2" – 0:25
 "Tatuarambá" – 2:58
 "Jingle do Disco" – 1:06
 "Lua-Gira-Sol" – 2:32
 "Cortina 3" – 1:04
 "Multiplicar-se Única" – 1:45
 "Cortina 4" – 0:44
 "O Pão Nosso de Cada Mês" – 2:45
 “Amar” – 3:16

References

Tom Zé albums
1992 compilation albums